The tenth edition of the Gent–Wevelgem's women's race was held on Sunday 28 March 2021. It was the fourth event of the 2021 UCI Women's World Tour and was won by Marianne Vos in a sprint.

Route
Due to the COVID-19 pandemic in Belgium, the race organisers ask spectators to follow the race from home and have released limited information on the course to the public before the race started.

Teams
Nine UCI Women's WorldTeams and fifteen UCI Women's Continental Teams will compete in the race. Out of 144 riders that started the race there were 111 finishers.

UCI Women's WorldTeams

 
 
 
 
 
 
 
 
 

UCI Women's Continental Teams

Results

See also
 2021 in women's road cycling

References

Gent-Wevelgem
Gent-Wevelgem
Gent–Wevelgem
Gent-Wevelgem (women's race)